
Year 739 (DCCXXXIX) was a common year starting on Thursday (link will display the full calendar) of the Julian calendar. The denomination 739 for this year has been used since the early medieval period, when the Anno Domini calendar era became the prevalent method in Europe for naming years.

Events 
 By place 
 Europe 
 The Lombards under King Liutprand sack the Exarchate of Ravenna, and threaten Rome. Pope Gregory III asks Charles Martel, Merovingian mayor of the palace, to help fight the Lombards (he also requests assistance in fighting the Byzantines and the Arabs). Liutprand signs a peace accord, and pulls back his forces to Pavia. After the pope's appeal to the Franks, a relationship begins that will continue as the Frankish Kingdom gains power.
 Umayyad conquest of Gaul: Charles Martel attacks Duke Maurontus of Provence and his Muslim allies. His brother Childebrand captures Marseille, one of the largest cities still in Umayyad hands. Maurontus is forced to go into hiding in the Alps.
 King Favila of Asturias dies after a 2-year reign (probably killed by a bear). He is succeeded by his brother-in-law Alfonso I, husband of his sister Ermesinda.
 Duke Pemmo of Friuli is deposed by Liutprand, and succeeded by his son Ratchis. He flees with his followers, but Ratchis secures his father's pardon.
 Theodatus Ursus is appointed hypatos (Byzantine consul) and magister militum of Venice.

 Africa 
 The Great Berber Revolt:  The Berbers break out in revolt against the Umayyad rulers at Maghreb, in response to the oppressive, (and, by Islamic law, illegal) tax-collection and slave-tribute. The rebellion is led by the chieftain (alleged water-carrier) Maysara al-Matghari. He successfully seizes Tangier, and rapidly captures much of western Morocco. The Berber rebellion which erupts not only undermines caliphal rule and fragments the wilayat or province of Ifriqiya (North Africa), but paves the way for the emergence of autonomous local Arab dynasties.

 By topic 
 Religion 
 Boniface, Anglo-Saxon missionary who has been Christianizing Bavaria, founds the bishoprics of Salzburg, Regensburg, Freising, and Passau.
 Willibrord, the first bishop of Utrecht in the Netherlands, and Northumbrian missionary, dies at Echternach (modern Luxembourg).

Births 
 Lu Mai, chancellor of the Tang Dynasty (d. 798)
 Yuan Zi, chancellor of the Tang Dynasty (d. 818)

Deaths 
 Aldwulf, Anglo-Saxon bishop
 Engelmund, Anglo-Saxon missionary
 Favila, king of Asturias (Spain)
 Nothhelm, Anglo-Saxon bishop
 Pemmo, duke of Friuli (Italy)
 Willibrord, Anglo-Saxon bishop

References